Vatroslav Lisinski Concert Hall is a large concert hall and convention center in Zagreb, Croatia. It is named after Vatroslav Lisinski, a 19th-century Croatian composer. The building has a big hall with 1,841 seats and a small hall with 305 seats. A large lobby doubles as an exhibition area.

History

The decision to build a new multifunctional hall in Zagreb was made in 1957. A team of architects led by Marijan Haberle won the design contest. The construction began in 1961, but flooding and financial difficulties pushed the completion date into the next decade. The hall was finally opened on 29 December 1973.

The concert hall has organized a number of concerts by musicians of all genres; it serves as the stage for classical music, opera, ballet and theater performances, as well as many international congresses and conventions. The hall saw 10 million visitors in the first thirty years of operation. In 2007, a total of 450 different shows were put together, recording over 760,000 visitors.

Vatroslav Lisinski Concert Hall was the venue of the 1990 Eurovision Song Contest, after its first major renovation in 1989. In 1992, the hall's copper roof cover was completely replaced. Further reconstruction and redecoration work was done in 1999 and 2009.

See also
List of concert halls

References

External links

  
 Virtual tour

Buildings and structures in Zagreb
Concert halls in Croatia
Culture in Zagreb
Music venues completed in 1973